Ilex karuaiana is a species of plant in the family Aquifoliaceae. It is endemic to Venezuela. It has been vulnerable status since 1998.

References

karuaiana
Endemic flora of Venezuela
Vulnerable flora of South America
Taxonomy articles created by Polbot